The 2022 Women's EuroHockey Junior Championship was the 20th edition of the Women's EuroHockey Junior Championship, the biennial international women's under-21 field hockey championship of Europe organised by the European Hockey Federation. The top five teams will qualify for the 2023 Women's FIH Hockey Junior World Cup.

It was held alongside the men's tournament in Ghent, Belgium from 24 to 30 July 2022. The tournament was originally scheduled to be held in Wavre but a venue change was required due to the initial venue not being ready in time due to flooding.

Spain were the defending champions but were eliminated in the group stage. Germany won their ninth title by defeating the hosts Belgium 4–3 in a shoot-out after the match finished 1–1. The Netherlands won the bronze medal by defeating England 2–1.

Qualified teams
Participating nations qualified based on their final ranking from the 2019 competition.

Preliminary round

Pool A

Pool B

Fifth to eighth place classification
The points obtained in the preliminary round against the other team are taken over.

Pool C

First to fourth place classification

Bracket

Semi-finals

Third place match

Final

Final standings

Goalscorers

See also
2022 Men's EuroHockey Junior Championship
2022 Women's EuroHockey Junior Championship II

Notes

References

Women's EuroHockey Junior Championship
Junior
EuroHockey Junior Championship
EuroHockey Junior Championship
International women's field hockey competitions hosted by Belgium
EuroHockey Junior Championship
Sports competitions in Ghent
EuroHockey Championship
EuroHockey Junior Championship